John Douglas Morgan (29 November 1907 – 25 August 1967) was a New Zealand track and field athlete who represented his country at the 1938 British Empire Games. He later became a successful athletics coach.

Early life and family
Born in Wellington on 29 November 1907, Morgan was the son of John Stanley Morgan and Emma Ethel Morgan (née Sauvarin). On 29 November 1928 he married Beatrice May Cole, and they had two children.

Athletics

Morgan later took up coaching, specialising in sprinting and hurdling.  He trained athletes including Peter Henderson, Avis McIntosh and Brenda Matthews.

Later life and death
A glass worker by trade, Morgan died in London on 25 August 1967.

References

1907 births
1967 deaths
Athletes from Wellington City
New Zealand male discus throwers
Commonwealth Games competitors for New Zealand
Athletes (track and field) at the 1938 British Empire Games
New Zealand athletics coaches